Natalia Sánchez Molina (born 27 March 1990) is a Spanish actress and singer, who is best known for portraying María Teresa "Teté" Capdevila Gómez on hit television Los Serrano.

Life and career 
Natalia Sánchez Molina was born on 27 March 1990 in Madrid. She has an older sister named Sandra. Sánchez speaks Spanish, English, Catalan, and French.

In 2004, Sánchez filmed a television commercial for El Corte Inglés with the rest of the main actors of Los Serrano.

From 2005 to 2012, Sánchez was in a relationship with Víctor Elías, her co–star from Los Serrano.

Since 2013, she has been in a relationship with Spanish actor Marc Clotet. They have two children: a daughter born in January 2019 and a son born in May 2020.

Filmography

Movies

Television

Discography

Santa Justa Klan

Albums
 2006: Santa Justa Klan (album)
 2007: DPM (album)

Singles
 2006: "A Toda Mecha"
 2006: "De 1 Al 10"
 2007: "Con Angelina Jolie Se Me Va La Olla"

References

External links 
 Official Website
 

1990 births
Living people
Actresses from Madrid
Spanish television actresses
Spanish film actresses
Singers from Madrid
Spanish female models
21st-century Spanish singers
21st-century Spanish women singers
21st-century Spanish actresses